Classic Enemies is a supplement published by Hero Games/Iron Crown Enterprises (I.C.E.) in 1989 for the 4th edition of the superhero role-playing game Champions.

Contents
Classic Enemies is a 112-page softcover book edited by Scott Bennie, with a cover by George Pérez, and illustrations by Pat Zircher and Mark Williams. The book contains detailed descriptions and game statistics for over 80 supervillains. Each has an individual illustration. Most of the villains originally appeared in Enemies, Enemies II, or Enemies III.

The supervillain prison of Stronghold is also described.

Reception
In the October 1990 edition of Dragon (Issue 162), Allen Varney gave a thumbs up, saying, "This book should be every Champions game GM's first supplement... If you run a four-color Champions campaign, you want this book."

Reviews
White Wolf #25 (Feb./March, 1991)

References

Champions (role-playing game) supplements
Role-playing game supplements introduced in 1989